Darcy Dolce Neto, or simply Neto (born February 7, 1981), is a retired Brazilian football right-back.

Attributes
Neto is a quite short, but agile and technically gifted footballer. He is a modern and atomic right wing back, but also if needed, can play on right midfield/wing position. He was the first short free-kick taker for Aris, and he scored five free kicks is his 4-year spell with the Thessalonian side.

Career
At one season, during his spell in Santos, was considered and pronounced as one of the leading right backs in Campeonato Brasileiro Série A. Also spent a couple of seasons on loan to some clubs in Brazil, before joining Aris 2007.
His fee, transferring to Aris, was about 200.000 euros. He immediately established himself into starting lineup, replacing another Brazilian full back Tuta from a season before. In summer 2009, was rumoured to be linked to Bolton Wanderers and a couple of more clubs from better leagues in Europe.

On December 8, 2009, he extended his contract up to 2013, which had been about to expire in summer 2010. At post contract-signing press conference, he declared himself as an Aris fan, loving this club. He unofficially rejected offers from a couple of Greek and clubs from abroad, saying that had he ever considered a move from Aris, that would have been only a club out of Greek boundaries, putting an end to any speculation about his potential departure. He was considered one of club's top and most consistent stars.

At the end of his contract (at the 2012–2013 superleague end) he was very close to signing with APOEL F.C. from Cyprus, but the next couple of days the Cypriots saw him sign with Bahia from Brazil.

On 27 January 2015, Neto returned to Greece as a player of Veria F.C. He signed a six-month contract. He made his official debut in a 0–2 away win against Levadiakos F.C. Veria didn't renew yet his contract but he was on a trial to the club. Neto failed on his trial, he's contact was not registered to Superleague Greece and the player was released.

On 4 September 2015, Neto was signed again by Veria as a free spot for non-EU players was created.

In July 2016, Neto returned to Aris to close his career with the team he loved.

References

External links
 
 Greeksoccer.com Neto topic

1981 births
Living people
People from São José do Rio Preto
Brazilian footballers
Brazilian expatriate footballers
Ituano FC players
Clube Atlético Sorocaba players
Botafogo Futebol Clube (SP) players
Associação Atlética Internacional (Limeira) players
Paraná Clube players
Santos FC players
Fluminense FC players
Aris Thessaloniki F.C. players
Esporte Clube Bahia players
Veria F.C. players
Campeonato Brasileiro Série A players
Super League Greece players
Expatriate footballers in Greece
Association football fullbacks
Footballers from São Paulo (state)